Bra is a town and comune in the province of Cuneo in the northwest Italian region of Piedmont.

Bra is the birthplace of the feminist philosopher Adriana Cavarero, politician Emma Bonino, and of the activist Carlo Petrini, founder of the Slow Food movement and of the world's first University of Gastronomic Sciences, whose main campus is located within Bra's municipal boundaries at Pollenzo. Bra is also home to "Cheese", a biennial international festival organised by Slow Food which features the makers of artisanal cheeses from around the world. In 1997 the event attracted some 150,000 visitors.

Among the structures in town is the intricately domed church of Santa Chiara by the late-Baroque architect, Bernardo Antonio Vittone and the church of St. Andrew, the facade of which was designed by the architect Gian Lorenzo Bernini, although not completed until two centuries later.

The town is famous for its gastronomy and the production of Bra sausage a veal sausage originally made for the Jewish inhabitants of neighbouring Cherasco. It is usually eaten raw.

Twin towns
 Spreitenbach, Switzerland
 Weil der Stadt, Germany
 San Sosti, Italy
 Corral de Bustos, Argentina

Notes

Cittaslow
Roero
Cities and towns in Piedmont